Abdul Aziz (born 11 January 1986) is a Pakistani footballer, who plays for National Bank of Pakistan FC. He is a member of Pakistan national football team.

Aziz is a midfielder who earned his first international cap during the IndoPak football series in 2005.

References

External links
 

1986 births
Living people
Pakistani footballers
Pakistan international footballers
Footballers at the 2006 Asian Games
Association football midfielders
Asian Games competitors for Pakistan
South Asian Games gold medalists for Pakistan
South Asian Games medalists in football